South Turramurra is a suburb on the Upper North Shore of Sydney in the state of New South Wales, Australia  north-west of the Sydney central business district, in the local government area of Ku-ring-gai Council. Turramurra and North Turramurra are separate suburbs.

South Turramurra is a leafy suburb, surrounded by the upper section of the Lane Cove National Park. There are many walking trails, including the Great North Walk and walking trails with access to neighbouring suburbs such as North Epping, Marsfield and West Pymble.

History
Turramurra is an Aboriginal word which is thought to mean either big hill, high place, or small watercourse. Early settlers referred to the area as Eastern Road until the name Turramurra was adopted when the railway station was built in 1897.

During the early 1990s a community organisation (Coalition Against Lane Cove Valley Freeways) was formed to oppose plans for the construction of the B2/B3 extension, designed to connect the M2 motorway in North Epping with the Pacific Highway.

South Turramurra became a separate suburb from Turramurra on 5 August 1994.

Demographics
Census data shows that: 
 South Turramurra's Age distribution reflects the popularity of the suburb with families and retirees. The median age was 42 years, compared to the national median of 38 years. Children aged under 15 years made up 23.7% of the population (national average is 18.7%) and people aged 65 years and over made up 18.1% of the population (national average is 15.8%).
  Ethnic diversity :  67.8% of people were born in Australia, compared to the national average of 65.5%; the next most common country of birth was England at 6.0.  77.6% of people only spoke English at home. Other languages spoken at home included Mandarin at 3.8%.
  Religion : The most common responses for religion were No Religion 32.6%, Anglican 21.0% and Catholic 17.8%.
 Finances: South Turramurra is a wealthy suburb. The median household weekly income was $2,564, compared to the national median of $1,438. This difference is also reflected in real estate, with the median mortgage payment being $3,000 per month, compared to the national median of $1,755.
 Housing: The great majority (98.2%) of occupied private dwellings were separate houses. The average household size was 3.1 people.

Transport
The nearest train station is Turramurra railway station. Buses to South Turramurra operate from Turramurra train station. The Transdev NSW bus route 571 runs between Turramurra and South Turramurra along Kissing Point Road, and route 572 runs the same route extended to Macquarie University.

The Comenarra Parkway, a minor arterial road consisting of only one lane in each direction, creates a boundary with Turramurra, to the north and West Pymble to the south.

Commercial area
South Turramurra Shopping Village is located on the corner of Auluba Road and Kissing Point Road.

Schools
 Turramurra High School Located on Maxwell Street
 Turramurra Public School is located on the south side of Turramurra but is technically in Turramurra, not South Turramurra

Parks
South Turramurra is surrounded on the other three sides by the Lane Cove National Park.
 Field of Dreams, Kissing Point Road near Vernon Street
 Sir David Martin Oval (Auluba Oval), Auluba Road (Home of Kissing Point Sports Club)
 Netball Courts, Canoon Road

Sport and recreation
The area is home to the Kissing Point Sports Club. The club consists of:
 Kissing Point Baseball Club
 Kissing Point Cricket Club
 Kissing Point Football Club
 Kissing Point Netball Club
 Kissing Point Softball Club

Community
The strong community support for the anti-freeway campaigners resulted in the protection of the bushland at the foot of the suburb of South Turramurra as part of the Lane Cove River National Park. Many different and diverse action groups were formed (and still remain) in order to effectively lobby government. The environmental community group STEP Inc, which was formed in South Turramurra in 1978 has grown to be a powerful force for the environment in northern Sydney.

1st Turramurra Scout Group is one of the oldest and strongest Scout Groups on the northside, with active programs for boys and girls aged from 8–11 Cub Scouts, 11–15 Scouts through to young men and women 15–17 Venturer Scouts and 18–25 Rovers.

Turramurra and Kissing Point Rover Scout Crews, both based on the south side of Turramurra, are active groups of young people aged 18~25, who are into a wide range of outdoor, social and community service activities.

There are also a number of Churches and various religious temples in South Turramurra, some having youth groups for children aged 5–18 years old.

Climate

References

External links
  [CC-By-SA]

Suburbs of Sydney
Ku-ring-gai Council
1885 establishments in Australia
Populated places established in 1885